Frederick Tennyson Hunt (January 17, 1917 in Brantford, Ontario — October 4, 1977) was a Canadian professional ice hockey winger who played 59 games in the National Hockey League with the New York Rangers and New York Americans between 1940 and 1945. The rest of his career, which lasted from 1937 to 1949, was mainly spent in the American Hockey League.

Career statistics

Regular season and playoffs

External links
 

1917 births
1977 deaths
Baltimore Orioles (ice hockey) players
Brantford Lions players
Buffalo Bisons (AHL) players
Canadian ice hockey right wingers
Hershey Bears players
New York Rangers players
New York Americans players
Ice hockey people from Ontario
Sportspeople from Brantford
Springfield Indians players
Toronto St. Michael's Majors players